Galiteuthis is a genus of glass squids from the family Cranchiidae and the subfamily Taoniinae. Squids in the genus Galiteuthis are large squids with mantle lengths measuring up to 660mm, although it has been suggested that mantle length could reach as much as 2.7m. The most distinctive feature of the speciesa in this genus are they have hooks on the tentacular clubs while there are no hooks on the arms, and by their long, thin, terminal fins.

The genus contains bioluminescent species.

Species
Five species are currently recognised:

Galiteuthis armata Joubin, 1898
Galiteuthis glacialis (Chun, 1906)
Galiteuthis pacifica (Robson, 1948)
Galiteuthis phyllura Berry, 1911
Galiteuthis suhmi (Hoyle, 1886)

References

External links

Squid
Cephalopod genera
Bioluminescent molluscs